Ab Chenar or Abchenar may refer to various places in Iran:
 Ab Chenar, Chaharmahal and Bakhtiari
 Ab Chenar-e Olya, Chaharmahal and Bakhtiari Province
 Ab Chenar-e Sofla, Chaharmahal and Bakhtiari Province
 Ab Chenar, Fars
 Ab Chenar, Khuzestan
 Ab Chenar, Andika,  Khuzestan Province
 Ab Chenar, Kohgiluyeh and Boyer-Ahmad
 Abchenar, Kohgiluyeh
 Ab Chenar-e Bid Anjir, Kohgiluyeh and Boyer-Ahmad Province

See also
 Ab Chenaru (disambiguation)
 Ab Chendar (disambiguation)